Eastern may refer to:

Transportation 
China Eastern Airlines, a current Chinese airline based in Shanghai
Eastern Air, former name of Zambia Skyways
Eastern Air Lines, a defunct American airline that operated from 1926 to 1991
Eastern Air Lines (2015), an American airline that began operations in 2015
Eastern Airlines, LLC, previously Dynamic International Airways, a U.S. airline founded in 2010
Eastern Airways, an English/British regional airline 
Eastern Provincial Airways, a defunct Canadian airline that operated from 1949 to 1986
Eastern Railway (disambiguation), various railroads
Eastern Avenue (disambiguation), various roads
Eastern Parkway (disambiguation), various parkways
Eastern Freeway, Melbourne, Australia
Eastern Freeway Mumbai, Mumbai, India
, a cargo liner in service 1946-65

Education 
Eastern University (disambiguation)
Eastern College (disambiguation)

Other uses
 Eastern Broadcasting Limited, former name of Maritime Broadcasting System, Canada
 Eastern Daily Press, a regional newspaper published in Norwich, England
 12th (Eastern) Division, a division of the British Army during the First World War
 12th (Eastern) Infantry Division, a division of the British Army during the Second World War
 Eastern Electricity, a defunct supply and distribution utility in England
 Eastern Savings and Loans, a credit union, based in Ipswich, United Kingdom
 Eastern Sports Club, a multi-sports club in Hong Kong, notable for its football and other section
 Eastern Sports Club (basketball), their basketball section
 Eastern Television, a cable TV network in Taiwan
 Eastern Time, United States
 Of or pertaining to the Eastern world

See also
Eastern District (disambiguation)
Eastern Province (disambiguation)
Eastern Region (disambiguation)
Eastern Division, Fiji
Ostern (Pseudo-German for "Eastern"), or "Red Western", Soviet and Eastern bloc countries' version of Western movies
East (disambiguation)